Sophy Wong (born 16 February 1992), also known as SOPHY, is a Hong Kong singer-songwriter.

Career 
Wong came 7th in The Voice (Hong Kong) in 2009. She released her debut EP, Sophrology EP  and formed her record label, Bunny Eats Ltd with Tsang-Hei Chiu in 2017. She followed up with her second EP, QUARTER EP

Discography

Extended plays

Awards and nominations

Jade Solid Gold Best Ten Music Awards Presentation

Metro Radio Music Awards

RTHK Top 10 Gold Songs Awards

Ultimate Song Chart Awards Presentation

Yahoo！Asia Buzz Awards

References

External links 
 
 

1992 births
Living people
21st-century Hong Kong women singers
Hong Kong women singer-songwriters
Cantopop singers